Jesús Daniel García Esparza (born 7 August 1994) is a Mexican footballer who currently plays for Gavilanes de Matamoros.

References

1994 births
Living people
Mexican footballers
Association football midfielders
Tecos F.C. footballers
Dorados de Sinaloa footballers
Cruz Azul footballers
Deportivo Toluca F.C. players
Deportivo Toluca F.C. Premier players
Murciélagos FC footballers
La Piedad footballers
Gavilanes de Matamoros footballers
Liga MX players
Ascenso MX players
Liga Premier de México players
Tercera División de México players
People from Navolato
Footballers from Sinaloa